Gail Brewer-Giorgio is an American author whose works have speculated about the possibility that singer Elvis Presley may have faked his death in August 1977.

Origin of conspiracy theory work

Giorgio wrote a novel, Orion, in 1978, which described how a popular Southern singer who called himself "Orion" faked his own death to escape the pressures of fame. According to Brewer-Giorgio, her publisher inexplicably began to recall her novel, which led her to investigate the circumstances surrounding the death of Presley. At about the same time; an actual singer, also calling himself Orion, who sounded and looked similar to Elvis, began giving performances wearing a mask, though it was later revealed that this performer was a little-known singer named Jimmy Ellis.  Brewer-Giorgio claims that his mask wearing was done without her consent, and that she had no connection with Ellis or his recordings.

Orion has been released three different times and is currently out of print. The first edition has a white cover with a design on it and "Orion" written over the design. The second edition is blue with a face printed on it, showing just the eyes of a singer with a mask over it and Orion written in red. The third edition has a black cover and was released only in Europe.

As a result of her investigations, Brewer-Giorgio published The Most Incredible Elvis Presley Story Ever Told in 1988. It was later retitled Is Elvis Alive?<ref>Susan Doll [http://entertainment.howstuffworks.com/elvis-presley-biography40.htm "Elvis Presley Biography] Retrieved on 2010-12-22.</ref> This book was described by communication theorist Jonathan Sterne as a "peculiar blend of paranormal phenomena, autobiography and fact finding." As part of the release of the book, Brewer-Giorgio appeared on shows such as Larry King Live, Nightline and The Oprah Winfrey Show.

Reactions to Brewer-Giorgio's works

Brewer-Giorgio's work had an impact in unintended areas. Fans of Elvis had been calling for a postage stamp bearing his image, but the rules of the United States Postal Service required a candidate to have been dead for 10 years. Elvis was under consideration in 1988; however given the questions raised by Brewer-Giorgio and the increase in Elvis-sightings following the publication of her book, the fact of his death was in doubt. This delayed publication of an Elvis stamp until 1993.

Published worksOrion (1978)The Most Incredible Elvis Presley Story Ever Told (1988) retitled as Is Elvis Alive?The Elvis Files: Was His Death Faked? (1990)Elvis Undercover: Is He Alive and Coming Back? (1999)Footprints in the Sand: The Life Story of Mary Stevenson, Author of the Immortal Poem'' (1995)

References

 http://www.nashvillescene.com/1999-11-04/news/it-s-only-make-believe/

 

American non-fiction writers
Living people
Year of birth missing (living people)